

Results
Green denotes finalists

External links
Preliminary Results
Final Results

Synchronised swimming at the 2009 World Aquatics Championships